SongBird Survival (SBS) is an independent, UK-wide, environmental bird charity that funds research into the decline in Britain's songbirds. It is a not-for-profit organisation supported by grants, subscriptions and donations, and a registered charity and company.

Governance
SongBird Survival is a non-profit organisation, constituted as a Charitable Company under the laws of England & Wales. The governing document is the Memorandum and Articles of Association. Under the Memorandum and Articles and subsidiary documents, SongBird Survival is run by a Council of up to 21 persons elected by the membership. Council members are elected for 1-year, renewable terms.

History
Formed in 1996 as Songbird Survival Action Group, SongBird Survival was registered as a limited company on 26 September 2000. Shortly afterwards, in 2001, the organisation achieved charitable status. In 2006, SBS merged with the Scottish charity Save our Songbirds, founded in 1998 by John Baillie-Hamilton, 13th Earl of Haddington. In 2017 SongBird Survival launched the national awareness day: National Robin Day

Aims
SongBird Survival's objective is to improve, protect and preserve the population of song and other small birds for the benefit of national biodiversity and the public. It aims to achieve this by commissioning and funding scientific research, supporting the conservation and restoration or habitats, through public education and advocacy where changes in the law may be deemed necessary to protect songbirds.

Research
SBS funds scientific research into the reasons why songbird numbers are declining in the UK. By doing so, the charity aims to advance the science of ornithology, and in particular the study of song and other small birds, as well as contribute to the national evidence base by researching areas where scientific evidence is currently sparse, inadequate or lacking.

SBS commissions research to add to the evidence base and identify the drivers behind continued songbird declines. Its research to date has encompassed a range of issues, spanning countryside management, population ecology, complex predator-prey dynamics, and predator control, including bringing together previously unpublished research conducted at farms across Britain.

References

Bird conservation organizations
Environmental organisations based in England
Environmental organizations established in 2001
Songbirds